Mordellistena malkini is a species of beetles is the family Mordellidae.

References

malkini
Beetles described in 1854